The Fernleigh Track is a multi-use rail trail near Belmont in New South Wales. The track was constructed in the way of the former Belmont railway line. The project is a joint venture between Newcastle City Council and City of Lake Macquarie. The former railway closed in December 1991. The first section between Adamstown and Burwood Road opened in 2003. Construction has continued in stages with the final section between Jewells and Belmont completed in March 2011.

The abandoned Belmont railway line was a coal haulage and passenger rail line from Adamstown to Belmont. In 1880 a rail line was built to Redhead with the line being extended to Belmont in 1916. At one stage there was talk of extending the line to Swansea.

A feature of the conversion of the former railway to a multi-use trail is the retention of many industrial heritage features. The trail passes through the brick-lined Fernleigh Tunnel under the Pacific Highway.

At the site of the former Kahibah station, the cycleway is crossed by the Great North Walk, a  walking trail connecting Newcastle and Sydney. The track also passes through the centre of the Glenrock Lagoon catchment.

Track details

Station/platform (distance)
 Adamstown: (0)
 Fernleigh:
 Kahibah:
 Dudley Junction:
 Burwood Platform:
 Whitebridge:
 Redhead:
 Redhead South:
 Jewells:
 John Darling Platform:
 Belmont:

Track statistics

 Level crossings, 5
 Tunnels, 1 (curved - )
 Over Bridges, 2
 Drive through culvert, 1 (Little Flaggy Creek)
 Stations or Platforms, 10
 Signal Boxes, 4
 Major colliers served, 5
 Maximum gradient, 1 in 40
 Minimum elevation,  (nr Belmont Station)
 Maximum elevation,  (on main line)
 Length of Line,

History of the line
 1880 - Rail line opened to Redhead
 December 1916 - Rail line extended to Belmont
 12 October 1922 - Special train left Newcastle for the opening of "Soldiers' Memorial Hall" at Kahibah.
 January 1925 - Redhead Loop name changed to Fernleigh Loop
 1967 - Last passenger steam train to Belmont
 8 April 1971 - At 17:10 the last rail passenger train to Belmont via Kahibah left Newcastle Station.
 19 December 1991 - Rail line closed
 2 February 2003 - Adamstown to Kahibah Station stage of the Fernleigh Track (cycleway) opened
 August 2004 - Dudley Junction to Whitebridge Station section of Fernleigh Track completed
 7 May 2005 - Kahibah Station to Whitebridge Station section officially opened.
 November 2009 - Whitebridge Station to Redhead Station section of Fernleigh Track completed
 November 2010 - Redhead Station to Jewels section of Fernleigh Track completed
 12 March 2011 - Fernleigh Track fully completed.

References

External links
 Rail Trails Australia
 Newcastle Cycleways Movement
 Lake Macquarie City Council
 Premiers Council for Active Living
 Kahibah Public School's Fernleigh Track site
 NSWRail.net diagram of Belmont line
 Curve and gradient data including the Belmont line

City of Lake Macquarie
Newcastle, New South Wales
Rail trails in Australia
History of Newcastle, New South Wales